Tanja Gellenthien ( Jensen) is a Danish archer competing in women's compound events. She won the gold medal in the women's individual compound event at the 2021 European Archery Championships held in Antalya, Turkey.

Gellenthien and Stephan Hansen won the gold medal in the mixed team compound event at the 2022 European Archery Championships held in Munich, Germany.

She represented Denmark at the 2022 World Games held in Birmingham, United States.

In 2023, she won the women's championship compound division of The Vegas Shoot, a prominent target competition organized by the National Field Archery Association. She had finished second at this event in 2022.

She is married to American archer Braden Gellenthien.

References

External links
 

Living people
Year of birth missing (living people)
Place of birth missing (living people)
Danish female archers
Archers at the 2019 European Games
European Games competitors for Denmark
Competitors at the 2022 World Games
21st-century Danish women